Madarihat Railway Station is a railway station that serves the town of Madarihat, lying on Doars region in the Indian state of West Bengal. The station lies on New Jalpaiguri–Alipurduar–Samuktala Road line of Northeast Frontier Railway zone, in the Alipurduar railway division. Major trains like the New Jalpaiguri–Alipurduar Tourist Special, Siliguri–Alipurduar Intercity Express, Siliguri–Dhubri Intercity Express and others stop and pass through this station.

References

Railway stations in West Bengal
Alipurduar railway division
Railway stations in Alipurduar district